Mu'iz-ud-din Umar Shaikh Mirza (1356 – February 1394) was a member of the Timurid dynasty and a son of its founder, the Central Asian conqueror Timur. Known for being a skilled soldier, Umar Shaikh was one of Timur's military commanders and also served as a regional governor. He died in 1394, predeceasing his father by over a decade.

Birth and early career
Umar Shaikh Mirza was one of four sons of Timur who survived infancy. His mother Tolun Agha was a concubine.

There is some disagreement regarding whether Umar Shaikh or his brother Jahangir Mirza was the eldest of Timur's sons. The Mu'izz al-Ansab (The Glorifier of Genealogies), the most important source regarding the structure of the Timurid royal family during this period, is contradictory on this point. It states that Jahangir was the eldest, but the family of Umar Shaikh is presented first in the genealogy itself, implying that he was born first. Narrative sources, such as the Zafarnama by Nizam al-Din Shami, and Yazdi's book of the same name support the notion that Umar Shaikh was older.

Umar Shaikh proved himself an accomplished warrior and a skilled horseman, taking part in many of his father's campaigns. In 1376, Timur appointed him governor of Ferghana.

War against Tokhtamysh

In 1388, war broke out between Timur and his former mentee, the Khan of the Golden Horde, Tokhtamysh. By this point, Tokhtamysh and Timur had already engaged each other several times.

Timur's lands were attacked on two fronts; Tokhtamysh launched his assault from Bukhara while his ally Qamar-ud-din Dughlat did so from Ferghana. At the same time, a rebellion erupted in the province of Khwarazm. Umar Shaikh was sent against Dughlat, while Timur himself marched towards Tokhtamysh. Dughlat was quickly defeated by the prince, prompting Tokhtamysh to flee from Timur's advance. Timur at this point diverted his attention to Khwarezm and brutally suppressed the rebellion, resulting in the devastation of the region.

Tokhtamysh once more attempted to attack in the winter of that year but was again defeated, this time by Umar Shaikh. Timur chased the Khan out of his lands and in 1391 launched a counteroffensive against him. This culminated in the Battle of the Kondurcha River, which took place in the Golden Horde territory of Volga. Umar Shaikh led the left wing of the army, his brother Miran Shah the right, their nephew Muhammad Sultan the centre and Timur himself the rear. While initially indecisive, the battle seemed to turn in the Khan's favour when Umar Shaikh's contingent was detached from the main army and nearly overwhelmed. However, this was averted when Tokhtamysh himself was forced to abandon the field while under attack by Timur, leading to confusion and panic among his troops. The Golden Horde's army was routed and forced to flee, the soldiers being chased and cut down by the Timurids. The death toll of the battle was estimated to have been 100,000 men and women.

Death

In 1393, Timur defeated the Persian Muzaffarid dynasty with the capture and execution of its final monarch, Shah Mansur. Timur bestowed the kingdom's former territory of Fars on Umar Shaikh to administer as governor. The prince's earlier post of Ferghana was given to his son Iskandar Mirza.

However, Umar Shaikh was not able to hold this position for long. In 1394, whilst answering summons from his father, Umar Shaikh was killed after being shot in the neck by an arrow fired from the Tuz Khurmatu fortress, near the city of Baghdad. Timur reportedly did not show any emotion upon learning of his son's death.

Umar Shaikh's governorship was given to his eldest son Pir Muhammad, while his body was escorted by his wives and his younger son Iskandar to the city of Kesh (modern day Shahrisabz). Here, he was buried alongside his brother in the Tomb of Jahangir, part of the Dorussaodat mausoleum complex. Presently, the tomb is the best surviving part of the structure.

Wives and concubines
Malikat Agha: daughter of the Khan of Moghulistan, Khizr Khoja. Later remarried to his brother Shah Rukh.
Qutlugh Tarkhan Agha Mughal
Sultan Agha
Beg Malik Agha: daughter of Khwaja Yusuf Apardi
Bakht Sultan: daughter of Yasaur Jalayir
Tuglugh Sultan Jalayir: later remarried to his nephew Pir Muhammad
Mihr Khush
Qutlugh Tarkhan
Takish Khatun
A daughter of Haji Beg Jauni Qurbani
Sivinch Qutlugh Agha: daughter of Mu’ayyad Arlat by Timur's sister Shirin Beg Agha

Issue
By Malikat Agha
Pir Muhammad (1379 – 1409)
Iskandar (1384 – 1415);
Ahmad (1385 – 1425)
Bayqara (1393 – 1423)
Isfandiyar
By Qutlugh Tarkhan Agha Mughal
Rustam (1381 – 1424/5)
By Tuglugh Sultan Jalayir
Sayyid Ahmad (b.1390)
By Sultan Agha
Muhammad
Nasab Sultan;
By Bakht Sultan
Bistam
Zubayda Sultan: married Yadgar Shah Arlat
By Mihr Khush
Ali
Umar
Sa'adat Sultan: married Sultan Mahmud, Khan of Moghulistan
By Takish Khatun
Dastan
By Beg Malik Agha
Baba Biki
By Qutlugh Tarkhan
Jahan Sultan Agha: married Taghay Bugha Barlas

References

Bibliography

Timurid dynasty
1356 births
1394 deaths
Generals of the Timurid Empire
Governors of the Timurid Empire